The Rio da Casca Ecological Station is an ecological station in the state of Mato Grosso, Brazil.
It protects a partly deforested area of savanna.

Location

The Rio da Casca Ecological Station (ESEC) is divided between the municipalities of Chapada dos Guimarães (76.61%), Cuiabá (10.84%) and Campo Verde (12.52%) in the state of Mato Grosso.
It lies to the east of the MT-450 state highway and is south of the BR-251 federal highway.

History

The Rio da Casca Ecological Station was created by state governor decree 6.437 of 27 May 1994.
The consultative council was created on 15 December 2014.

Environment

The ESEC is just over 87% savannah, and about 13% contact between savannah and seasonal forest.
It overlaps about 7% with the Chapada dos Guimarães Environmental Protection Area.
The ESEC was about 65% deforested at time of creation, and since then has lost a further 4% of forest coverage.
The Casca River, a tributary of the Roncador River, runs through the ESEC from south to north.

Notes

Sources

1994 establishments in Brazil
Ecological stations of Brazil
Protected areas of Mato Grosso
Protected areas established in 1994